is a former Japanese football player.

Playing career
Suzuki was born Saitama City and joined local side Urawa Reds as a trainee from school. He turned professional in 1996, but was released in 1997 without making his first team debut for Reds, signing for Regional Leagues side Yokogawa Electric.

Suzuki moved to J2 League side Albirex Niigata in January 1999. He made his debut for the club in a 1–0 victory over Montedio Yamagata, scoring the winner in the 98th minute. He played as regular player in 3 seasons. In 2002, he moved to Kyoto Purple Sanga (later Kyoto Sanga FC) on loan. He played as left midfielder in all matches in 2 seasons. The club also won the champions 2002 Emperor's Cup first major title in the club history. In 2004, he returned to newly was promoted to J1 League club, Albirex Niigata. He became a fan's favourite during his seven seasons at the club, playing a total of 222 games and scoring 53 goals.

In July 2007, he moved to Oita Trinita. He became a regular player as left side midfielder. In 2008, the club won the champions J.League Cup first major title in club history. However he could not play at Final for suspension. In 2009, although he played as regular player, his opportunity to play decreased in late 2009 and the club was relegated to J2.

In 2010, he moved to Kyoto Sanga FC for the first time in 7 years. However he could hardly play in the match. The club was also relegated to J2 from 2011. In 2012, he moved to Tokyo Verdy. However he could not play at all in the match and he moved to Giravanz Kitakyushu in August.

In February 2013, Suzuki signed for the Albirex Niigata Singapore of Singapore League. He made his Singapore debut in a game against Home United the following month. Suzuki retired from playing professionally at the end of the season.

Coaching career
Suzuki took the position as the academy coach of Kyoto Sanga FC.

Club statistics

References

External links

1978 births
Living people
Association football people from Saitama Prefecture
Japanese footballers
J1 League players
J2 League players
Urawa Red Diamonds players
Albirex Niigata players
Kyoto Sanga FC players
Oita Trinita players
Tokyo Verdy players
Giravanz Kitakyushu players
Japanese expatriate footballers
Japanese expatriate sportspeople in Singapore
Expatriate footballers in Singapore
Association football midfielders